"Love Needs No Disguise" is a 1981 single by Dramatis featuring Gary Numan on vocals. It charted at number 33 on the UK Singles Chart. It got its live debut on The Warriors Tour in 1983. Of the song, Numan recalled:"This was just the break they needed; I didn’t have anything to do with the writing of the song and I had a great time recording the video"

Track listing

Charts

References

External links
 

1981 songs
1981 singles
Dramatis songs
Gary Numan songs
Beggars Banquet Records singles